Anaid Productions is a Canadian television production company that produces both non-fiction and drama series. It was established in 1993 by Margaret Mardirossian. There are offices in Vancouver, British Columbia and Edmonton, Alberta.

Shows produced 
The Family Restaurant
The Quon Dynasty
The Rig
Mentors
Taking it Off
The Liquidator
The Tourist
X-Weighted
X-Weighted Families

References

External links 
 Anaid Productions

Television production companies of Canada